Ronald Smith is the Damon Wells Professor in the department of Geology & Geophysics at Yale University. He leads Yale’s program in mesoscale meteorology and regional climate, and is the Director of the Yale Center for Earth Observation (YCEO).

Academic biography
Ronald Smith earned his Bachelor’s and Master’s degrees in aerospace engineering from Rensselaer Polytechnic Institute and Princeton University and his PhD in geophysics from Johns Hopkins University.

Research
He is the PI of The DOMinica EXperiment, a project to measure orographic precipitation in the tropics. He is also the PI of the DEEPWAVE Project, which studies gravity waves generated in the troposphere that propagate upwards to the mesophere near New Zealand.

Honors
He is a Fellow of the American Meteorological Society and won the Society’s Jule G. Charney Award in 2011.

References

External links
http://people.earth.yale.edu/profile/ronald-smith/about

Living people
American meteorologists
Yale University faculty
Year of birth missing (living people)
Fellows of the American Meteorological Society